Glencoe is an unincorporated community in southern Fulton County, Arkansas, United States. Glencoe has a post office with ZIP code 72539.

References

Unincorporated communities in Fulton County, Arkansas
Unincorporated communities in Arkansas